Haigermoos is a municipality in the district of Braunau am Inn in the Austrian state of Upper Austria. Today nothing remains of the infamous Weyer concentration camp for Roma placed here before 1945.

Geography
Haigermoos lies in the upper Innviertel halfway between Salzburg and Braunau am Inn.

References

Cities and towns in Braunau am Inn District